Ayluna Putri (born Muhammad Fatah; 16 June 1989), better known by her stage name Lucinta Luna, is an Indonesian actress, model, singer, and comedian. She is a trans woman.

Born with birth name Muhammad Fatah in Jakarta, Indonesia, as the eighth child of Muntoha and Djuneha, Luna completed her high school education.

She started her career as a singer and dancer by participating in a reality show with the nickname Cleo Vitri, Luna then formed a duo group called Dua Bunga (English: Two Flowers) along with singer Ratna Pandita.

Early life 
Lucinta Luna was born Muhammad Fatah on 16 June 1989 in Jakarta, Indonesia, to Djoneha (26 December 1953 – 13 April 2018) and Muntoha (died June 2001). She was the eighth of ten children.

Personal life 
Luna married a Filipino man named Bigham on 21 March 2019; they divorced after one week.

Controversy

Drug case 
On 11 February 2020, Luna along with three others was arrested by police and taken into custody due to alleged possession and consumption of ecstasy.

She was sentenced to one year and six months in prison and a fine of IDR 10 million, Luna was released from Rutan Kelas IIA Pondok Bambu on 11 February 2021 due to assimilation.

References

External links 
 

Living people
1989 births
Indonesian female models
Indonesian film actresses
Indonesian singers
Transgender actresses
Transgender entertainers